Samuel D Zien (born August 7, 1959), known as Sam the Cooking Guy, is a Canadian-born television cook, YouTuber, restaurateur, and cookbook author, based in San Diego, California.

Television career
Zien's career in television began after quitting his job as an executive for a San Diego pharmaceutical company.  In 2001, after a poorly timed effort to begin a career in travel television which was derailed by the September 11 attacks, he switched his focus to a cooking show.  He produced his own test screening and distributed the tape to local San Diego television stations.  San Diego's then-Fox affiliate XETV-TDT offered him a two to three minute slot during its morning news program.  The job was unpaid—a situation that changed after his work earned a Regional Emmy from the National Television Academy's Pacific Southwest Chapter.

In January 2005, Zien moved to County Television Network (CTN), San Diego County's public-access television, after CTN offered him a half-hour time slot on their station. His Sam the Cooking Guy show spread to other cities through agreements with sister cable companies; his work was recognized with more Regional Emmys and a book deal from John Wiley and Sons.

Zien's next break came from the Discovery Health Channel, where Zien signed a deal to shoot the first season of a series called Just Grill This! The network was subsequently purchased by the Oprah Winfrey Network; Zien's show was not renewed for a second season.

In 2008, Zien appeared on NBC's The Today Show in a segment with Kathy Lee Gifford and Hota Kotb. After being interrupted repeatedly during the first half of the segment, Zien suddenly spoke emphatically - "Please, can I talk? I watch the show every day, everybody has issues with a lot of chatter back here. Pay attention, one minute." A clip of the segment appeared on YouTube following its airing and in days had surpassed 2,000,000 views, with most commenters applauding Sam for his firm stance in the face of the NBC hosts.

YouTube channel 
On May 23, 2011, Zien premiered The Sam Livecast, an Internet cooking show originating from his home kitchen. Three new episodes per week feature food-related and other subject matters. After 200 live episodes, the production switched to a live-to-tape format.

After moving away from the live streamed format, The Sam Livecast transitioned into a YouTube channel under a different name - Sam the Cooking Guy - and experienced a surge in subscribers and views, reaching over 3 million subscribers by December 2021.

Restaurants 
In July 2018, Zien opened his first restaurant - Not Not Tacos - a casual dining establishment featuring Zien's unique take on non-traditional tacos. Located within the Little Italy Food Hall in the Little Italy area of downtown San Diego, Zien serves tacos such as Korean Short Rib, Pulled Pork with Macaroni and Cheese, Seared Salmon, and Meatloaf.

In March 2020, Zien opened a second restaurant in the Little Italy Food Hall, called Graze by Sam.

In April 2021, Zien opened a third also located in the Little Italy Food Hall, called Samburgers.

Cookbooks 
Zien has written five cookbooks. All were published by John Wiley & Sons except this most recent book was published by Countryman Press:
Just a Bunch of Recipes (2008)
Awesome Recipes and Kitchen Shortcuts (2010)
Just Grill This! (2011)
Sam the Cooking Guy: Recipes with Intentional Leftovers (2020)
Sam the Cooking Guy: Between the Buns: Burgers, Sandwiches, Tacos, Burritos, Hot Dogs & More (2022)

References 

 Manna, Marcia, "Serving up TV success", San Diego Union-Tribune, November 22, 2006, retrieved November 10, 2008
 Zien, S., "About Sam the Cooking Guy," Sam the Cooking Guy, retrieved November 9, 2008
 "What is The Sam Livecast?," What is The Sam Livecast?, retrieved December 8, 2011

External links 
 
 Just Cook This!
 Sam the Cooking guy tells Kathie Lee and Hoda be quiet at YouTube

Living people
American male chefs
American food writers
American public access television personalities
American television chefs
Canadian emigrants to the United States
Emmy Award winners
Food and cooking YouTubers
People from San Diego
1959 births